The 2018 Tour de France was the 105th edition of Tour de France, one of cycling's Grand Tours. The Tour began in Noirmoutier-en-l'Île with a flat stage on 7 July, and Stage 11 occurred on 18 July with a mountainous stage to La Rosière. The race finished on the Champs-Élysées in Paris on 29 July.

Classification standings

Stage 1
7 July 2018 – Noirmoutier-en-l'Île to Fontenay-le-Comte, 

The race departed from Noirmoutier-en-l'Île heading south, following the coast to Les Sables-d'Olonne. The route then turned southeast with an intermediate sprint at La Tranche-sur-Mer. Continuing east, the race passed through Chaillé-les-Marais before the category 4 climb of the Côte de Vix and a bonification point at Maillezais. The race then turned north to the flat finish at Fontenay-le-Comte.

Several crashes in the final  resulted in general classification contenders Chris Froome, Adam Yates and Richie Porte all losing 51 seconds. Meanwhile, Nairo Quintana suffered a puncture and lost over a minute on the general classification.

Stage 2
8 July 2018 – Mouilleron-Saint-Germain to La Roche-sur-Yon, 

The stage departed from Mouilleron-Saint-Germain heading east. The riders turned northeast at La Châtaigneraie, west at Saint-Pierre-du-Chemin and then north at Réaumur. The race then headed over the category 4 Côte de Pouzauges and continued northwest through Les Herbiers to Tiffauges. The race turned west to Montaigu and then southwest through Boufféré and Les Lucs-sur-Boulogne to Palluau. The riders then continued south through Aizenay to an intermediate sprint at Beaulieu-sous-la-Roche and then southeast to Nieul-le-Dolent. The route then turned east to a bonification point at Saint-Florent-des-Bois, and northwest to the finish line at La Roche-sur-Yon.

Sylvain Chavanel went ahead of the peloton from the start of the stage, gaining a temporary lead of four and a half minutes, eventually being caught  from the finish. Tsgabu Grmay became the first retirement of the Tour, abandoning  from the stage finish. Adam Yates recovered from a crash  from the finish. Fernando Gaviria, the yellow jersey holder, crashed on a sharp right-hand bend in the last  of the stage, allowing Sagan to take the lead.

Stage 3
9 July 2018 – Cholet to Cholet,  (TTT)

For the team time trial, the teams departed from Cholet heading north to Saint-Léger-sous-Cholet. The riders then turned west to the first timecheck at the village of Saint-André-de-la-Marche, in Sèvremoine, and turned south. From La Romagne the route turned east, with the second timecheck at La Séguinière. The teams then headed back to the finish line in Cholet. The route was expected to take each team about 39 minutes.

|}

Stage 4
10 July 2018 – La Baule to Sarzeau, 

The riders departed west and then northeast from La Baule, with racing beginning just before Guérande. The race continued northeast to La Chapelle-des-Marais and then east through Pontchâteau to Blain. After heading northeast to Nozay, the race turned north to an intermediate sprint at Derval. The route then turned west, heading through Guémené-Penfao and Redon to the category 4 climb of the Côte de Saint-Jean-la-Poterie. The riders then continued through Allaire, to a bonification point at Limerzel, and turned southwest to Muzillac. The race then headed west to the slight uphill finish at Sarzeau.

From the start of racing, Dimitri Claeys, Anthony Perez, Jérôme Cousin and Guillaume Van Keirsbulck broke away from the peloton, building a temporary lead of approximately eight minutes. At  before the finish, a crash caused Rigoberto Urán and Ilnur Zakarin to lose contact with the peloton. Urán managed to chase back to the peloton before the finish, while Zakarin lost nearly a minute on the general classification. The participants in the original breakaway group were all eventually caught by the peloton, within the last , allowing for a sprint finish.

Stage 5
11 July 2018 – Lorient to Quimper, 

The riders departed west from Lorient, with racing beginning after passing through Ploemeur. The riders then headed northwest through Moëlan-sur-Mer, Pont-Aven and Trégunc. At Concarneau the route turned north to Saint-Yvi and then northeast to an intermediate sprint at Roudouallec. The route then meandered west over the category 4 climb of the Côte de Kaliforn and the category 4 Côte de Trimen. After continuing through Châteauneuf-du-Faou to the category 3 Côte de la Roche du Feu, the race headed through Châteaulin and over the category 3 Côte de Menez Quelerc'h. The riders then headed southwest to the category 3 Côte de la montagne de Locronan. Heading southeast, a bonification point occurred at the Côte de la chapelle de La Lorette, before the uphill finish in Quimper.

Stage 6
12 July 2018 – Brest to Mûr-de-Bretagne Guerlédan, 

The riders departed from Brest heading north to Bourg-Blanc and then northeast to Loc-Brévalaire. The route turned east at the D28 road, continuing southeast to the category 3 climb of the Côte de Ploudiry and then south to Sizun. Turning east, the race continued over the category 4 climb of the Côte de Roc'h Trévézel, through Huelgoat, Poullaouen, Carhaix-Plouguer, Maël-Carhaix and Rostrenen to an intermediate sprint at Plouguernével. The route continued east through Gouarec to Saint-Aignan, where the route turned north. The riders then climbed the  category 3 Mûr-de-Bretagne Guerlédan, passing the finish line for the first time, before a bonification point at Saint-Mayeux. Turning southeast to Saint-Gilles-Vieux-Marché and then south, the riders then continued to the town of Mûr-de-Bretagne, before turning north for the second climb of the category 3 route to the finish line.

A leading group of five, including Damien Gaudin, Fabien Grellier, Laurent Pichon, Dion Smith and Anthony Turgis, went in front of the peloton from the beginning of racing. The group established a seven-minute lead at the Côte de Roc'h Trévézel. With  remaining, the race was subjected to crosswinds, which reduced the leading group's advantage to less than three and a half minutes, and temporarily split the peloton. The leading group was caught before the first ascent of the Mûr-de-Bretagne. In the few kilometres after the first ascent, Jack Bauer launched a temporary attack off the front of the peloton. Tom Dumoulin punctured with  remaining, and eventually lost nearly a minute to the other general classification contenders. On the second ascent of the Mûr-de-Bretagne, Richie Porte staged an initial attack. Dan Martin counter-attacked, and held the lead to the finish.

Stage 7
13 July 2018 – Fougères to Chartres, 

For the longest stage of the Tour, the race departed east from Fougères, passing through Mayenne and Alençon to the category 4 climb of the Côte du Buisson de Perseigne, just before Neufchâtel-en-Saosnois. The riders then travelled through Mamers and Bellême before an intermediate sprint at Berd'huis. The route then passed through Nogent-le-Rotrou, to a bonification point at Nonvilliers-Grandhoux, and then continued east to the finish line in Chartres.

Stage 8
14 July 2018 – Dreux to Amiens, 

The stage departed north from Dreux, heading through Anet, to the category 4 climb of the Côte de Pacy-sur-Eure and northeast to Vernon. The race turned northwest and then north to Les Andelys, then northeast to the category 4 climb of the Côte de Feuquerolles. The riders then had an intermediate sprint at La Neuve-Grange, and continued through Gournay-en-Bray and Crèvecœur-le-Grand. A bonification point occurred at Loeuilly, before the flat finish in Amiens.

André Greipel and Fernando Gaviria initially finished second and third, respectively, but were both relegated due to an irregular sprint.

Stage 9
15 July 2018 – Arras to Roubaix, 

The route to Roubaix included fifteen sectors of pavé covering . This stage was considered likely to include an early start, to ensure no conflicting schedule with the 2018 FIFA World Cup Final.

The stage departed east from Arras, with the rolling start occurring before reaching Athies. The riders continued east to Arleux, and then southeast to the outskirts of Cambrai. The route then turned north and traversed sectors 15 and 14 of pavé, before an intermediate sprint at Wasnes-au-Bac. Sector 13 of pavé was crossed before Pecquencourt, and sectors 12, 11 and 10 as the riders headed northeast and then northwest to Orchies. Seven more sectors of pavé followed, as the route meandered north to the bonification point at Wannehain. The race then crossed the last two pavé sectors, before the finish in Roubaix.

A five-man group broke away from the front of the peloton, from the opening of the stage. Minutes later, Richie Porte suffered a collarbone injury after crashing on asphalt, and was forced to abandon the race. José Joaquín Rojas also abandoned around the same time. The leading group grew to ten riders, and established a lead approaching three and a half minutes, before sector 15 of the dry and dusty pavé. By sector 10 at Beauvry, the shrunken peloton was being led by Team Sky and had closed the gap, to the leading group, down to about two minutes. At this point, Tejay van Garderen had fallen a minute behind the peloton. Van Garderen crashed and punctured a few minutes later, and ended losing five minutes at the finish. This was one of multiple crashes or punctures for van Garderen and was the third and final time he nearly caught back up to the race when he finally stopped pursuing and fell back to assist team leader Uran. At the start of sector 6 at Pont-Thibault, the leading group's advantage had been reduced to around thirty seconds, with Reinardt Janse van Rensburg and Damien Gaudin attacking, at the head of the race. The original lead group was caught by the peloton, after sector 3 ended at Wannehain. Another lead group, including John Degenkolb, Greg Van Avermaert and Yves Lampaert, established itself before the start of sector 2 at Camphin-en-Pévèle. The new front group's lead extended to around forty-five seconds, by sector 1 at Willems, and held a lead to the finish. Most of the general classification contenders finished around half a minute behind, while Romain Bardet's incident-strewn ride finished a further few seconds back. Mikel Landa finished alongside Bardet, after Landa recovered from a crash in the last .

Rest day 1
16 July 2018 – Annecy

On the first rest day, Jens Keukeleire and Alexis Vuillermoz both announced their abandonment of the race. Both riders suffered fractures during the previous stage. Keukeleire's main injury was to a fibula, acquired during the same crash which forced Richie Porte to retire. Vuillermoz was injured to his right scapula, after colliding with a spectator during sector 3 of the pavé.

Stage 10
17 July 2018 – Annecy to Le Grand-Bornand, 

The stage departed from Annecy, heading south along the western side of Lake Annecy, with racing beginning after passing through Duingt. The riders turned north at Doussard and headed along the eastern side of the lake to Menthon-Saint-Bernard, turning northeast to the category 4 . The riders then turned north, descending through La Clusaz to the valley floor at Entremont. The riders then descended, winding north with an uncategorised intermediate climb through the Col des Fleuries and continuing the descent through La Roche-sur-Foron, before turning east. The race then descended to the finish line at Le Grand-Bornand.

The race had a late start because the 2018 La Course by Le Tour de France, a women's race organised by the organisation of the Tour de France, was held in the morning. The finale was identical to the men's stage. After the top of the  Col de la Colombière,  was left to the finish in Le Grand Bornand.

Stage 11
18 July 2018 – Albertville to La Rosière, 

The riders departed from Albertville heading northeast to an intermediate sprint at Villard-sur-Doron. The riders then faced an  descent to the valley floor at Bourg-Saint-Maurice.

Mark Cavendish finished an hour and five minutes behind Geraint Thomas, so was classified as outside the 31 minute and 27 second time limit for the stage. Mark Renshaw and Marcel Kittel also failed to finish within the time limit and were unable to continue the Tour. Meanwhile, Rick Zabel finished just outside the limit, but was allowed to continue by the race officials, having also been victim to a mechanical problem.

Notes

References

Sources
 

2018 Tour de France
Tour de France stages